William Fitzpatrick may refer to:

 William H. Fitzpatrick (1865–1932), American Democratic Party official
 William John Fitzpatrick (1830–1895), Irish historian
 William P. Fitzpatrick (born 1961), Irish-American politician
 William of Salisbury, 2nd Earl of Salisbury (died 1196), sometimes referred to as William fitz Patrick

See also 
 Fitzpatrick (surname)
 Fitzpatrick (disambiguation)